is a 1958 Japanese film directed by Seijun Suzuki. It marked Suzuki's first CinemaScope film and was also the first to be credited to his assumed name Seijun Suzuki.

References

External links
 
 
 Underworld Beauty  at the Japanese Movie Database

1958 films
Japanese black-and-white films
1958 crime films
1950s Japanese-language films
Yakuza films
Films directed by Seijun Suzuki
Nikkatsu films
1950s Japanese films